Dark Victory  is a novel by William Shatner, co-written with Judith and Garfield Reeves-Stevens, based upon the television series Star Trek. The novel was released in 1999 in hardcover format. This is the second in the "Mirror Universe Saga".  The story began with Spectre and concluded with Preserver.

Reception
L.D. Meagher, whilst writing for CNN, said that the book was not for the casual fan to get into as it wasn't intended to be a standalone novel and needed to be read as part of the series. He thought though that fans of the book series would be pleased with it.

References

External links

1999 Canadian novels
Novels based on Star Trek: The Original Series
Novels based on Star Trek: The Next Generation
Novels by William Shatner
Novels by Judith and Garfield Reeves-Stevens